The Sussex County Vocational School District is a county-wide vocational public school district located in Sparta Township serving students in ninth through twelfth grades and adult students from Sussex County, New Jersey, United States.

As of the 2018–19 school year, the district, comprised of one school, had an enrollment of 761 students and 62.0 classroom teachers (on an FTE basis), for a student–teacher ratio of 12.3:1.

School
The district's lone facility is Sussex County Technical School, which offers an extensive range of professional and trade instruction to county students. The local district is responsible to pay the tuition for students attending the school as well as to provide transportation.
Gus Modla, Principal
Stacy Crosson, Vice Principal
Debra Keiper, Vice Principal
Steve Masotti, Vice Principal

Administration
Core members of the district's administration are:
Gus Modla, Superintendent
Andrew Italiano, Business Administrator / Board Secretary

Board of education
The district's board of education, comprised of five members, sets policy and oversees the fiscal and educational operation of the district through its administration. As a Type I school district, four of the board's trustees are appointed by the Sussex County Board of chosen freeholders to serve three-year terms of office on a staggered basis, with either one or two seats up for appointment each year. The Executive County Superintendent serves on the board as an ex officio member. The board appoints a superintendent to oversee the day-to-day operation of the district.

References

External links 
Sussex County Vocational School District

Data for Sussex County Vocational School District, National Center for Education Statistics

School districts in Sussex County, New Jersey
Sparta, New Jersey
Vocational school districts in New Jersey